The 2014 Men's Australian Country Championships was a field hockey tournament held in Toowoomba, Queensland between 2–9 August 2014.

NSW Country won the tournament by defeating the QLD Country 2–1 in the final. VIC Country won the bronze medal following a 2–2 draw with the ADF.

Teams
Unlike other National Australian Championships the Australian Country Championships only comprises teams from regional/country associations of each Australian State, as well as a team from the Australian Defence Force.

 ADF 
  NSW Country
  QLD Country
  SA Country
  VIC Country
  WA Country

Competition format
The tournament is played in a round-robin format, with each team facing each other once. Final placings after the pool matches determine playoffs.

The fifth and sixth placed teams contest the fifth and sixth-place match, while the top four placed teams contest the semi-finals, with the winners contesting the final, and the losers contesting the third and fourth place playoff.

Results

Pool matches

Classification matches

Fifth and sixth place

First to fourth place classification

Semi-finals

Third and fourth place

Final

Statistics

Final standings

References

External links

2014
2014 in Australian field hockey